Mps one binder kinase activator-like 2A is an enzyme that in humans is encoded by the MOBKL2A gene.

References

Further reading